Daffy Duck: Fowl Play is a 2D platform video game featuring the Looney Tunes character Daffy Duck. It was released for the Game Boy Color in 1999 in North America and 2000 in Japan and Europe.

Plot and gameplay
Daffy wants to become rich so he joins Bugs Bunny on a treasure hunt. The player controls Daffy and navigates him through 6 levels in total. He can use dynamite to take out enemies and obstacles. At the end of each level, Bugs must be faced in order to progress to the next one. A password system is used to save progress. A minigame is played after clearing a level.

Reception
French gaming website Jeuxvideo.com gave it a rating of 13/20.
Total Game Boy Color gave it 88%.

References

External links
 Daffy Duck: Fowl Play at GameFAQs

1999 video games
Game Boy Color games
Game Boy games
Platform games
Sunsoft games
Video games developed in Japan
Video games featuring Daffy Duck
Cartoon Network video games